Noel Lane may refer to:

 Noel Lane (Galway hurler) (born 1954), Irish hurler, later a manager
 Noel Lane (Tipperary hurler) (born 1943), Irish hurler
 Noel Lane, British police officer killed in the Harrods bombing